VisiCorp was an early personal computer software publisher. Its most famous products were Microchess, Visi On and VisiCalc.

It was founded in 1976 by Dan Fylstra and Peter R. Jennings as Personal Software, and first published Jennings' Microchess program for the MOS Technology KIM-1 computer, and later Commodore PET, Apple II, TRS-80 and Atari 8-bit.  In 1979 it released VisiCalc, which would be so successful that in 1982 the company was renamed VisiCorp Personal Software, Inc..

 VisiCalc was the first electronic spreadsheet for personal computers, developed by Software Arts and published by VisiCorp.
 Visi On was the first GUI for the IBM PC.

Bill Gates came to see Visi On at a trade show, and this seems what inspired him to create a windowed GUI for Microsoft.  VisiCorp was larger than Microsoft at the time, and the two companies entered negotiations to merge, but could not agree on who would sit on the board of directors.  Microsoft Windows when it was released included a wide range of drivers, so it could run on many different PC's, while Visi On cost more, and had stricter system requirements.  Lotus released Lotus 1-2-3 in 1983. Microsoft eventually released its own spreadsheet Microsoft Excel.

Early alumni of this company included Ed Esber who would later run Ashton-Tate, Bill Coleman who would found BEA Systems, Mitch Kapor founder of Lotus Software and the Electronic Frontier Foundation, Rich Melmon who would co-found Electronic Arts, Bruce Wallace author of Asteroids in Space, and Brad Templeton who would found early dot-com company ClariNet and was the director of the Electronic Frontier Foundation from 2000 to 2010.

VisiCorp agreed in 1979 to pay 36-50% of VisiCalc revenue to Software Arts, compared to typical software royalties of 8-12%. It composed 70% of VisiCorp revenue in 1982 and 58% in 1983. By 1984 InfoWorld stated that although VisiCorp's $43 million in 1983 sales made it the world's fifth-largest microcomputer-software company, it was "a company under siege" with "rapidly declining" VisiCalc sales and mediocre Visi On sales. The magazine wrote that "VisiCorp's auspicious climb and subsequent backslide will no doubt become a How Not To primer for software companies of the future, much like Osborne Computer's story has become the How Not To for the hardware industry."
 VisiCorp was sold to Paladin Software after a legal feud between Software Arts and VisiCorp.

References

Defunct computer companies based in Massachusetts
Software companies disestablished in 1984
Software companies established in 1976
Defunct software companies of the United States